The Dinka are a North African ethnic group.

Dinka may also refer to:

 Dinka language, a group of languages spoken by the Dinka people
Dinka alphabet, the alphabet in which the Dinka language is written
 Dinka (grape), a Hungarian wine grape
 Dinka (DJ), a Swiss DJ

People with the surname and given name 
 Berhanu Dinka (1935–2013), Ethiopian diplomat and economist
 Tesfaye Dinka, Ethiopian politician and Prime Minister of Ethiopia
 Dinka Džubur, Australian actress, model and filmmaker.
 Dinka Kulić, Croatian volleyball player

See also

Donka (disambiguation)